Inopacan (IPA: [ɪno'pakɐn]), officially the Municipality of Inopacan, is a 4th class municipality in the province of Leyte, Philippines. According to the 2020 census, it has a population of 21,389 people.

Etymology
The name of the town is a namesake of a legendary winged hero named by the natives as “Inong pak-an”, according to old folks.  But history tells that Inopacan is a new name of Canamocan which was a pre-Spanish settlement according to Lee W. Vance in his book, Tracing our Ancestor and the analytical understanding of the written manuscripts of the Jesuit missionaries in Leyte. However, it remains unaccepted despite that Canamocan was mentioned as now 'Inopacan' by some authors like Atty. Francisco Tantuico of the history of Baybay, Locsin on Ormoc's History, and Eduardo Makabenta Sr. on Carigara's history.

History
Much of the documents that could be a good source for learning about the history of Inopacan were destroyed when the town hall as well as the parish church and its convent were leveled into rubbles as the Japanese war planes bombed these buildings during the World War II. But based on the account of Inopacnon elders and records from neighboring towns, Inopacan was once a barangay of Hindang. with Fernando Polistico (a Boholano) as the first appointed Capitan del Barrio, and was succeeded by Francisco Espinoza, and lastly by Agustín Kudéra before Inopacan became a town on December 6, 1892.

Geography
In the south, Inopacan borders with the town of Hindang and Camotes Sea in the west.

Apid and Mahaba Islands, part of the Cuatro Islas, are within the administrative jurisdiction of the municipality of Inopacan.

Barangays
Inopacan is politically subdivided into 20 barangays.

Climate

Demographics

Economy

References

External links

 
 [ Philippine Standard Geographic Code]
Philippine Census Information
Local Governance Performance Management System 

Municipalities of Leyte (province)